Khadiyal is a rural locality (a selo) and the administrative center of Khadiyalsky Selsoviet, Tlyaratinsky District, Republic of Dagestan, Russia. The population was 304 as of 2010. There are 2 streets.

Geography 
Khadiyal is located 16 km east of Tlyarata (the district's administrative centre) by road. Tadiyal is the nearest rural locality.

References 

Rural localities in Tlyaratinsky District